Prismatocarpus is a genus of flowering plants belonging to the family Campanulaceae.

Its native range is South African Republic.

Species:

Prismatocarpus alpinus 
Prismatocarpus altiflorus 
Prismatocarpus brevilobus 
Prismatocarpus campanuloides 
Prismatocarpus candolleanus 
Prismatocarpus cliffortioides 
Prismatocarpus cordifolius 
Prismatocarpus debilis 
Prismatocarpus decurrens 
Prismatocarpus diffusus 
Prismatocarpus fastigiatus 
Prismatocarpus fruticosus 
Prismatocarpus hispidus 
Prismatocarpus implicatus 
Prismatocarpus lasiophyllus 
Prismatocarpus lycioides 
Prismatocarpus lycopodioides 
Prismatocarpus nitidus 
Prismatocarpus pauciflorus 
Prismatocarpus pedunculatus 
Prismatocarpus pilosus 
Prismatocarpus rogersii 
Prismatocarpus schlechteri 
Prismatocarpus sessilis 
Prismatocarpus spinosus 
Prismatocarpus tenellus 
Prismatocarpus tenerrimus

References

Campanuloideae
Campanulaceae genera